Thryptomene caduca is a species of flowering plant in the family Myrtaceae and is endemic to a small area in the north-west of Western Australia. It is a spreading shrub with crowded egg-shaped leaves with the narrower end towards the base, and pink flowers with five petals and seven to nine stamens.

Description
Flowering mainly occurs from July to September.

Taxonomy
Thryptomene caduca was first formally described in 2014 by Barbara Lynette Rye and Malcolm Eric Trudgen in the journal Nuytsia from specimens collected by G.J. Keighery and N. Gibson in 1996. The specific epithet (caduca) means "dropping off early", referring to the bracteoles.

Distribution and habitat
The shrub grows in sandy places including coastal sand dunes and is found from near Tamala Station to near Hamelin Pool and Kalbarri, often with Banksia or Eucalyptus species.

Conservation status
Thryptomene caduca is classified as "Priority Two" by the Western Australian Government Department of Parks and Wildlife meaning that it is poorly known and from only one or a few locations.

References

caduca
Endemic flora of Western Australia
Rosids of Western Australia
Plants described in 2014
Taxa named by Barbara Lynette Rye
Taxa named by Malcolm Eric Trudgen